Mavželj (minced pork filling in net) is a national Slovene dish. It is known mostly in Slovene Carinthia and also in Upper Carniola. It is made of the soup in which the pork head was cooked, and of the remnants of the meat and the brains of the same pork head. The dish is ball-shaped and comes in various local variations. In the past, the preparation of this net wrapped ball called mavželjni was much more popular than today. Potters made special earthen baking moduls to fit their shape. The dish was mainly eaten on holidays.

Preparation
Boil pork head scraps and lungs and brains separately. Chop them. Add cooked polenta and spices. Chop onion and sauté and use them as larding. Make fist-size balls and wrap them in pork net separately. Place balls in baking mould and bake.

Variations
Today's variants are diverse by the sort of the meat used, there can be pork meat, cow meat, turkey meat or chicken meat used. In the new vegetarian variant it can be used with soya which are roasted on the vegetable fat. The bread can be substituted with rice. For more luxury variants we wrap the loafs before roasting into pork owens and we can also add the eggs.

See also
 Kransky
 List of pork dishes
 Slovenian cuisine

References

External links
 Mavželj with photo

Slovenian cuisine
Pork dishes
Offal